Norman Lock (13 March 1912 – February 1999) was an English cricketer. He played one first-class match for Surrey in 1934.

See also
 List of Surrey County Cricket Club players

References

External links
 

1912 births
1999 deaths
English cricketers
Surrey cricketers
Sportspeople from Surrey